Portugal was represented by Paulo de Carvalho, with the song "E depois do adeus", at the 1974 Eurovision Song Contest, which took place on 6 April in Brighton. "E depois do adeus" was chosen as the Portuguese entry at the Grande Prémio TV da Canção Portuguesa on 7 March.

Before Eurovision

Festival da Canção 1974
The Grande Prémio TV da Canção Portuguesa 1974 was held at the Teatro Maria Matos in Lisbon, hosted by Glória de Matos and Artur Agostinho. Ten songs took part in the final. The results were determined by a distrital jury, that had 20 votes each, and a selection jury, composed of nine elements, to vote, each one with 10 votes to distribute among the songs in the contest. For the first time, Funchal was called to vote

At Eurovision 
On the night of the final Carvalho performed 16th in the running order, following Switzerland and preceding Italy. The voting system tried between 1971 and 1973 was abandoned, and for 1974 returned to the previous system of ten jury members in each country awarding one vote each.

At the close of the voting the song had received 3 points, placing joint last (along with Germany, Norway and Switzerland). The orchestra during the Portuguese entry was conducted by José Calvário.

Voting

Aftermath 
Despite the modest showing in Brighton at the Contest itself, the song achieved considerable fame as one of the two signals to launch the Carnation Revolution in Portugal against the Estado Novo regime of Marcelo Caetano - the other being the folk song "Grândola Vila Morena" by Zeca Afonso, which was the signal for the coup leaders to announce that they had taken control of strategic parts of the country. It was broadcast at 22.55 on 24 April 1974 by 'Emissores Associados de Lisboa'.

Histories of the Contest tend to take a facetious view of this fact. In his Official History of The Eurovision Song Contest author John Kennedy O'Connor, for example, describes it as "the only Eurovision entry to have actually started a revolution", while Des Mangan suggests that other Portuguese entries (he mentions 1998's "Se eu te pudesse abraçar") would not be likely to inspire coups.

References 

1974
Countries in the Eurovision Song Contest 1974
Eurovision